Ramal de Aljustrel is a closed railway line which connected the stations of Castro Verde-Almodôvar, on the Linha do Alentejo, to Aljustrel, in Portugal. It was opened on 2 June 1929 and closed around 1993.

See also 
 List of railway lines in Portugal
 List of Portuguese locomotives and railcars
 History of rail transport in Portugal

References

Railway lines in Portugal
Railway lines opened in 1929
Railway lines closed in 1993
Iberian gauge railways